Joss Garman (born 1985) is a British environmental and humanitarian campaigner who has worked as a campaign leader for Greenpeace UK, and as a director of The Syria Campaign. At the Institute for Public Policy Research he worked as associate director for energy, transport and climate change before becoming adviser to the UK Shadow Secretary of State for Energy & Climate Change Lisa Nandy MP.

Education

Born in Radnorshire, Mid-Wales, he attended his local comprehensive school before going on to read Politics at SOAS, University of London.

Family

His father, David Garman, was the inventor of the world's first bath lift and in 2015 was appointed an OBE for services to the healthcare industry.

Activism

In August 2007, ahead of the Camp for Climate Action, Garman was named in a High Court injunction by airport operator BAA in a bid to prevent environmental protests at Heathrow.

References

1985 births
Living people
Alumni of SOAS University of London
British environmentalists